The Sinner is a 1928 German silent drama film directed by Mario Bonnard and starring Elisabeth Pinajeff, Hans Stüwe, and Helga Thomas. The film's art direction was by Max Knaake.

Cast

References

Bibliography

External links

1928 films
Films of the Weimar Republic
German silent feature films
Films directed by Mario Bonnard
National Film films
German black-and-white films
German drama films
1928 drama films
Silent drama films
1920s German films
1920s German-language films